"Alright" is a song by British alternative rock band Supergrass. It was released with "Time" as a double A-side single from their debut album, I Should Coco (1995), on 3 July 1995. It was concurrently released on the soundtrack of the 1995 movie Clueless, which helped it become a big hit for the band. It peaked at number two on the UK Singles Chart, number six in Iceland, number eight in Ireland, number 30 in France and number 96 in Australia. It is the band's most successful single on the charts.

Music and lyrics
"Alright" received a great deal of airplay in the United Kingdom. The "bona fide teen anthem", with its upbeat lyrics and cheerful piano tune, seemed to epitomise British youth culture at the time, when Britpop was at its height. The band's youthful appearance (lead singer Gaz Coombes had only just turned 19 when it was released) added weight to the lyrics.

However, Coombes himself argued in an interview around October 1995, "it wasn't written as an anthem. It isn't supposed to be a rally cry for our generation. The stuff about 'We are young/We run green...' isn't about being 19, but really 13 or 14. and just discovering girls and drinking."

"It's meant to be light hearted and a bit of a laugh, not at all a rebellious call to arms." with Danny Goffey also saying: "It certainly wasn't written in a very summery vibe. It was written in a cottage where the heating had packed up, and we were trying to build fires to keep warm."

The second A-side "Time" is a slower, more blues-driven track, with the song even incorporating a harmonica solo. The B-side, "Condition", is a cover of "Just Dropped In (To See What Condition My Condition Was In)" by Mickey Newbury and originally a hit for Kenny Rogers. "Je Suis Votre Papa Sucre" (I Am Your Sugar Daddy) is a short instrumental.

Reception
"Alright" was the fifth single to be released from I Should Coco. While "Caught by the Fuzz", "Mansize Rooster", "Lose It", and "Lenny" all charted (with "Lenny" even scraping the Top Ten in the UK Singles Chart) and were warmly received by the critics, it was "Alright/Time" – the final release from the album – which proved to be their breakthrough single, largely due to the popularity of the song "Alright". In his weekly UK chart commentary, James Masterton wrote, "If every band has their masterpiece in them, then this is surely the one for Supergrass." He added, "Sounding like a cross between the Small Faces and Duran Duran, "Alright" was a smash before it had even been released, one of those perfect pop records that makes you want to turn the radio up as loud as possible whenever you hear it." A reviewer from Music Week gave the song four out of five, commenting, "The irrepressible trio manage yet again to come up with a catchy summer single that could almost become an anthem for the younger generation. These boys can do no wrong." Leesa Daniels rated it five out of five in the 5 July issue of Smash Hits, calling it "a lovely jaunty affair with plinky, plonky piano and guitars."

"Alright/Time" reached number two in the UK Singles Chart, making it Supergrass' highest charting single to date along with "Richard III". It remained in the top three for one month. The song became a huge hit with school leavers within the United Kingdom that summer, leading to a huge demand for the track back in the United Kingdom. The double A-side also peaked at number 96 on the Australian ARIA Singles Chart in October 1995. "Alright" by itself peaked at number eight in Ireland and number 30 in France.

In 1999, in an interview, Coombes joked "We don't play 'Alright' anymore. We should play it in a minor key, and in the past tense."

Music video

The success of the record was helped by a lively promotional video directed by Dom and Nic featuring the band joyfully messing around on bicycles and a wheeled bed at Portmeirion in North Wales and recreated elements of 1960s television series The Prisoner also filmed there. Having seen the video, Steven Spielberg approached the band and proposed that they work together on a television series in the style of The Monkees.

The group turned him down, preferring to work on their second album In It for the Money. Troy Carpenter, co-director of Nude as the News, claims "the gesture says a lot about the band's personality – one which has stuck with the group throughout its career – which is basically that of a fun-loving rock group whose undeniable musical talent is sometimes overshadowed by the sheer ebullience of its music."

Track listing

Charts and certifications

Weekly charts

Year-end charts

Certifications

Use in Pop Culture 
-Top Gear: Used in 1995 for Jeremy Clarkson's review of the Vauxhall Vectra where he talked about the song rather than the car itself because it was too dull.

Covers and other versions
In 1996, a parody music video was created for an episode of Spitting Image, featuring the puppets of the Labour Party, playing the members as young and fun loving.
In 2007, Alvin and the Chipmunks covered the song with a few lyric changes, for their video game Alvin and the Chipmunks.
In 2010, Travie McCoy sampled the song for his single "We'll Be Alright", from his first solo album, Lazarus.
In 2011, the French band BB Brunes covered the song in the album Nico Teen Live.

References

External links
 

1995 singles
1995 songs
Parlophone singles
Supergrass songs